Zachariah John Churchill (born May 25, 1984) is a Canadian politician from Nova Scotia. He serves as the member of the Nova Scotia House of Assembly for Yarmouth, first elected in 2010.

Early life and education
Churchill graduated from Saint Mary's University in 2007 with a Bachelor of Arts degree. He served as National Director of the Canadian Alliance of Student Associations from 2007 to 2009, representing student organizations across Canada. In 2010, he was serving as Policy Analyst at the Department of Human Resources and Skills Development for the federal government before taking a leave of absence to run for the Nova Scotia Liberal Party in Yarmouth.

Political career
Churchill was nominated by the Liberal Party in the riding of Yarmouth in May 2010.  He won the by-election held on June 22, 2010, which was contested by six high-profile candidates.  Churchill garnered over half the popular vote, defeating John Deveau, who had served as MLA for the region, and by Charles Crosby, who served as Mayor of Yarmouth for two decades, and two minor-party leaders. Churchill became the first Lebanese Canadian elected to the Nova Scotia House of Assembly.

Churchill was re-elected during the 2013 general election. On October 22, 2013, Premier Stephen McNeil appointed Churchill to the Executive Council of Nova Scotia as Minister of Natural Resources.

On July 24, 2015, McNeil shuffled his cabinet, moving Churchill to Minister of Municipal Affairs and Minister of Communications Nova Scotia. On June 15, 2017, Churchill was shuffled into the Minister of Education and Early Childhood Development portfolio.

As Minister of Education and Early Childhood Development, Churchill introduced major reforms into Nova Scotia's education system. This included the introduction of universal Pre-primary across the province, a Liberal campaign commitment during the 2017 election.

During the 2021 Nova Scotia Liberal Party Leadership Election, Churchill supported Iain Rankin in his bid to become leader. After Rankin's election as Leader of the Nova Scotia Liberal Party and Premier of Nova Scotia, Churchill became Minister of Health and Wellness, serving in Rankin's cabinet until August 31, 2021. Churchill served as Health Minister during the COVID-19 pandemic, holding the position for six months.

Churchill was re-elected for the fourth time in 2021, winning the riding of Yarmouth with 56% of the vote.

In the wake of the Liberal Party's defeat in the 2021 Nova Scotia General Election election, Churchill became Deputy Leader of the Official Opposition and Health Critic.

Personal life

Churchill resides in Yarmouth, Nova Scotia with his wife Katie and two young daughters.

Controversy 
In 2019, two MLAs (including PC Leader Tim Houston) alleged they had been accosted by Churchill. They described the incidents as verbally and physically threatening. Churchill admitted that he could be "confrontational", but denied physical altercations. Maureen MacDonald, former NSNDP leader, says Churchill became physical with a member of her caucus.

Electoral record

|-

|-

|Progressive Conservative
|John Cunningham
|align="right"|1,216
|align="right"|14.31
|align="right"|-19.10
|-

|New Democratic Party
|Charles Webster
|align="right"|224
|align="right"|2.64
|align="right"|-3.88
|-

|}

|Progressive Conservative
|Charles Crosby
|align="right"|2,628
|align="right"|33.41
|align="right"|-27.93

|Independent
|Belle Hatfield
|align="right"|673
|align="right"|8.56
|align="right"|Ø

|New Democratic Party
|John Deveau
|align="right"|513
|align="right"|6.52
|align="right"|-16.41

References

External links
Members of the Nova Scotia Legislative Assembly
Liberal caucus profile

1984 births
Living people
Members of the Executive Council of Nova Scotia
Nova Scotia Liberal Party MLAs
People from Yarmouth, Nova Scotia
21st-century Canadian politicians
Saint Mary's University (Halifax) alumni
Canadian politicians of Lebanese descent